John Clayton (23 April 1907–unknown) was an English professional footballer who played in the Football League for Carlisle United, Chesterfield, Mansfield Town and Wrexham.

References

1907 births
Date of death unknown
English footballers
Association football midfielders
English Football League players
Loughborough Corinthians F.C. players
Chesterfield F.C. players
Wrexham A.F.C. players
Carlisle United F.C. players
Mansfield Town F.C. players
Grantham Town F.C. players
Gainsborough Trinity F.C. players